Borussia Dortmund clinched its 6th national championship, thanks to a stellar ending to the season, passing long-time leaders Bayer Leverkusen in the penultimate round, before sealing the title with a win on the final day. It also reached the final of the UEFA Cup, where it had the disadvantage of playing away from home against Feyenoord. With skipper Jürgen Kohler being sent off in his final match of the career, Feyenoord were able to win 3–2 and deprive Dortmund of its first international title since its famous UEFA Champions League victory in 1997.

Key players in Dortmund's success were Czech duo Jan Koller and Tomáš Rosický, top scorer Márcio Amoroso and German internationals such as Christoph Metzelder, goalkeeper Jens Lehmann and Christian Wörns. It was coach Matthias Sammer's first season in charge, and the 1996 European Player of the Year was an instant hit, becoming one of the very few coaches to win one of Europe's top domestic league at his first attempt.

Squad

Left club during season

Competitions

Bundesliga

League table

Champions League

Third qualifying round

Group stage

UEFA Cup

Third round

Fourth round

Quarter-finals

Semi-finals

Final

References

Notes

Borussia Dortmund seasons
Borussia Dortmund
German football championship-winning seasons